Semmeninathar Karumbeswarar Temple is a Hindu temple located near Vishnampettai in the Thanjavur district of Tamil Nadu, India. The temple is dedicated to Shiva.

Mythology 
According to Hindu mythology, the mythical Brahmin sage Parasurama worshipped Shiva at this place to get rid of the sin of killing Kshatriyas. The place is also associated with legends of the Chola king Karikala.

Significance 
Praises of the temple have been sung by the Saivite saints Sambandar and Thirunavukkarasar.

References 
 

Shiva temples in Thanjavur district
Padal Petra Stalam